The Paumonok Handicap was an American Thoroughbred horse race held annually at Aqueduct Racetrack in Queens, New York. A six furlong sprint race, it was open to horses aged three years and older.

The race was inaugurated in 1906 at the now defunct Jamaica Racetrack in Jamaica, Queens, New York. It was hosted by the Jamaica track from 1906 to 1908 and from 1915 to 1959.

Belmont Park hosted it in 1913.

Due to the passage by the New York Legislature of the Hart–Agnew Law outlawing gambling in New York State, there was no race run in 1909, 1911, 1912, and 1914.  

The Paumonok Handicap was run in two divisions in 1943 and again in 1975.

Records
Speed record:
 1:08.86 Don Six (2005)
 1:08.80 Duck Dance (1972)

Most wins:
 2 – Red River (1907, 1908)
 2 – Silver Fox (1926, 1927)
 2 – Devil Diver (1944, 1945)
 2 – True And Blue (1990, 1991)
 2 – Bishop Court Hill (2006, 2007)

Most wins by a jockey:
 5 – Laverne Fator (1923, 1926, 1927, 1929. 1933)

Most wins by a trainer:
 5 – Sam Hildreth (1910, 1923, 1926, 1927, 1929)
 5 – James E. Fitzsimmons (1938, 1939, 1940, 1941, 1943)

Most wins by an owner:
 4 – Rancocas Stable (1923, 1926, 1927, 1929)

Winners

References

Previously graded stakes races in the United States
Discontinued horse races in New York City
Open sprint category horse races
Recurring sporting events established in 1906
Recurring sporting events disestablished in 2011
Aqueduct Racetrack
Jamaica Race Course